Peaches are trees and its edible fruits.

Peaches may also refer to:

People
See Musicians section below for additional people

Nickname
 Jane Bartkowicz (born 1949), American tennis player
 Peaches Davis (1905–1995), American Major League baseball pitcher
 Peaches Graham (1877–1939), American Major League Baseball catcher
 Romanus Nadolney (1899–1963), American National Football League player
 Peaches O'Neill (1879–1955), American Major League Baseball catcher in the 1904 season
 Peaches Wallace (1909–1930), American pioneering aviatrix
 Tso-ay (c. 1853–1933), Apache warrior and army scout

Stage or ring name
 Peaches, the stage name of seven different women who have appeared as half of the vocal duo Peaches & Herb
 Miriamm Wright (born 1971), American singer-songwriter who served as Peaches in 2002
 Meritxell Negre (1971–2020, Spanish singer-songwriter who served as Peaches in 2009
 Peaches Browning (1910–1956), American actress
 Lori Fullington (born 1967), American professional wrestling manager who wrestled as "Peaches"
 Miss Peaches (1924–2011), American comedian and singer

Other people
 Peaches Geldof (1989–2014), British journalist, television presenter and model
 Peaches (murder victim) (died 1997), unidentified murder victim from New York

Fictional characters
 Peaches, in Sam Hurt's comic strip Eyebeam and its spinoff, Queen of the Universe
 Peaches, in the direct-to-DVD video Futurama: Bender's Game (2008)
 Peaches, a baby woolly mammoth in computer animated family film Ice Age: Dawn of the Dinosaurs (2009)
 Peaches, in the film Ken Park (2002)
 Peaches, on the television series Rocko's Modern Life
 Peaches, one of Weebl's cartoons

Film and television
 Peaches (film), a 2004 movie starring Emma Lung
 The Peaches, a 1963 short film directed by Michael Gill
 "Peaches", an episode of the 2012 television series The River

Music

Musicians
 Peaches (group), a 1970s Australian band
 Peaches (Swedish duo), a Swedish child duo
 Peaches (musician), a Canadian punk/electroclash musician

Albums
 Peaches: The Very Best of The Stranglers, a 2002 compilation album
 Peaches (EP), a 2021 EP by South Korean singer Kai

Songs
 "Peaches" (In the Valley Below song), 2013
 "Peaches" (Justin Bieber song), 2021
 "Peaches" (Kai song), 2021
 "Peaches" (The Presidents of the United States of America song), 1996
 "Peaches" (The Stranglers song), 1977
 "Peaches", by Nat King Cole from 10th Anniversary Album
 "Peaches", by the Darts, 1980

American baseball teams
 Macon Peaches, an American minor league baseball franchise in Macon, Georgia
 Marysville Peaches, a former American minor league baseball team in Marysville, California
 Rockford Peaches, a former women's professional baseball team in Rockford, Illinois

Other uses
 Peaches Records and Tapes, a former American music and entertainment retailer

See also
 Peach (disambiguation)
 Peaches and cream (disambiguation)
 Apricot (disambiguation)

Lists of people by nickname